Bad Salzungen is a town in Thuringia, Germany. It is the capital of the Wartburgkreis district.

Geography

Location

Divisions
In July 2018 the former municipalities of Ettenhausen an der Suhl, Frauensee and Tiefenort were merged into Bad Salzungen. In December 2020 the former municipality Moorgrund was absorbed. In total the municipality consists of the central town (Kernstadt) and 21 sections (Ortsteile).

Neighbouring communities
Bad Salzungen borders on the following municipalities, from the south and clockwise: Dermbach, Weilar, Leimbach, Krayenberggemeinde, Vacha, Werra-Suhl-Tal, Gerstungen, Ruhla, Bad Liebenstein, Barchfeld-Immelborn (all in Wartburgkreis), and Breitungen in Schmalkalden-Meiningen district.

Twin towns – sister cities

Bad Salzungen is twinned with:
 Mezőkövesd, Hungary (1969)
 Strakonice, Czech Republic (1977)
 Bad Hersfeld, Germany (1990)
 Ishøj, Denmark (1994)

Infrastructure
Near the town, there is a Bundeswehr barrack, the Werratal-Kaserne, which was built in 1972 for the GDR Army.

Bad Salzungen station is located on the Eisenach–Lichtenfels railway.

Notable people
 Johann Theodor Roemhildt (1684-1756), Baroque composer
 Richard Mühlfeld (1856-1907), clarinettist
  (1878-1937), engineer and inventor of the Beck arc lamp and headlamp Beck
  (1895-1966), a machinist, Reichsbanner-official, party official (SPD/SED) and chairman of the council of Meiningen district
 Gerhard Unger (1916-2011), tenor
 Thomas Hertel (born 1951), composer
  (born 1951), journalist, Stern magazine
 Steffen Skel (born 1972), luger
 Alexander Zickler (born 1974), soccer player and German international
 Mark Zimmermann (born 1974), football player and coach at FC Carl Zeiss Jena
 Ronny Ackermann (born 1977), Nordic Combined
 Christian Hirte (born 1976), German politician (CDU)
 Philipp Marschall (born 1988), biathlete and former cross-country skier
 Thomas Bing (born 1990), cross-country skier

References

External links

Wartburgkreis
Duchy of Saxe-Meiningen
Spa towns in Germany